Master Ping Xiao Po (simply Po; born as Li Lotus) or also known as in the franchise "Kung Fu Panda", is the title character and protagonist of the Kung Fu Panda franchise, primarily voiced by Jack Black and Mick Wingert. He is an anthropomorphic giant panda who is improbably chosen as the champion of the Valley of Peace in the first film. Po is the prophesied Dragon Warrior or Dragon Master, as well as the Warrior of Black and White.

He is the adoptive son of Mr. Ping and is one of Master Shifu's students. Po is also the team leader of the Furious Five, although he is not properly part of it as he is considered as a second master after Shifu to the Furious Five. In Kung Fu Panda: Legends of Awesomeness, Po is revealed to have the ability to learn kung fu at a glance.

Personality

Po's (played by Jack Black in the films) main interest lies in Kung Fu. He developed a comprehensive knowledge of the lore of warriors, famous combat moves, dates and historical artifacts. His deep appreciation of the martial arts extends into its philosophical aspects, enabling him sometimes to achieve insights of which even deeply respected masters like Shifu cannot conceive. He was popular with all his friends and they all loved him as a kid. He is an excellent cook but has terrible table manners.

Though Po's real passion was for Kung Fu, he was reluctant to reveal this to his father in fear of disappointing him. Despite having a mild and friendly personality, Po also developed a severe self-loathing, believing himself a failure for his size and being a species not known for a warrior tradition. When upset, he usually gorges on food.

Appearances

Feature films

Kung Fu Panda (2008)

In the first Kung Fu Panda film, Po (Jack Black) was dubbed as the Dragon Warrior by Master Oogway (Randall Duk Kim), much to the protest of Po and his fellow masters. During his subsequent training, Master Shifu (Dustin Hoffman) and the Furious Five made no secret of their disdain for Po, assigning him rough physical activities in hopes of discouraging him. However, with the encouragement of Master Oogway, Po endures the abuse without complaint, hoping that they could eventually change him into someone respectable. This display of indomitable tenacity, although frustrating to Shifu, soon impresses most of the Furious Five, who begin to warm up to Po, whom they also end up finding to be an excellent cook.

Shifu, discovering that Po can perform considerable physical feats when motivated by food, uses this to train Po with a custom training regimen. At the end of the training, during a chopstick-sparring match over dumplings, Po demonstrates considerable skill in combat—which includes Po's use of his bulk to his advantage—and some emotional maturity allow Po to somewhat reduce his emotional dependence on food. This is evident when Po eagerly gives the last dumpling back to Shifu after winning the sparring match, stating that he is not hungry.  

Now convinced of Po's worthiness, Shifu presents the legendary Dragon Scroll to Po, only to find that it's just a blank reflective surface. Shifu and the team soon learn that the snow leopard Tai Lung (Ian McShane) has escaped from Chorh-Gom Prison, where he was held under maximum-security-like measures. In despair, Shifu orders Po and the Furious Five to help the villagers escape while Shifu buys some time by engaging Tai Lung in a fight to the death. As Po helps his father, Mr. Ping (James Hong), to escape, Ping reveals that the secret ingredient of his "Secret Ingredient Soup" is nothing; instead, people only had to believe it was special. With this advice, Po realizes that the scroll's true empowering symbolic value: whatever someone turns themselves into, with enough dedication, can make them the best version of themselves.

Encouraged, Po is then able to challenge Tai Lung in a climactic battle and defeat him with an improvised combat style, using his body fat not only to shield his nerves from chi strikes but also for deflecting attacks. Amazed by his new talent, the Furious Five finally acknowledge Po as a true kung-fu master with respect, much to his surprise. Since the film's climax events, Po has now divided his time between practice, working at his father's noodle shop, and teaching children martial arts.

Kung Fu Panda 2 (2011)

In Kung Fu Panda 2, the villainous peacock Lord Shen's (Gary Oldman) wolf forces perform a raid looking for refined metal to use in Shen's cannons. The attempt of Po (Jack Black) and the Furious Five to stop the raid is thwarted by seeing the fealty symbol on the Boss Wolf (Danny McBride). The symbol gives Po a traumatic childhood flashback of the attack on his village and freezes him on the spot. He discovers that Mr. Ping (James Hong), a Chinese goose, is not his birth father; rather, he was only adopted by him. When Po asks about his past, Ping has no knowledge of anything from before he found Po behind the noodle shop.

When Po is sent with the Five on a mission to stop Lord Shen's attempt to conquer China, he is plagued with disturbing dreams about his parents replacing him with a radish. He is reluctant to talk about them, even to Tigress (Angelina Jolie), who grew to be Po's confidant among the Five. More seriously, Po is still hampered with his paralyzing flashbacks, especially at the sight of the same symbol on Lord Shen's plumage. This creates a subsequent obsession in Po to question Shen, which results in him almost getting killed.

Po survives Shen's cannon attacks and is rescued by the elderly Soothsayer (Michelle Yeoh), who heals Po's body with acupuncture and medicinal brew. Po, now able to recall all his memories of being orphaned, finds inner peace in light of recalling the happy and fulfilling life with his loved ones in the 'Valley of Peace.' By achieving tranquility, Po defeats Lord Shen's fleet—much to everyone's astonishment—by using a martial arts technique that counters Shen's cannon fire by literally grabbing the fired projectiles and returning them destroy their launchers. In doing so, Po saves China while cementing his reputation as one of the mightiest warriors. Afterward, Po returns to his adoptive father, Mr. Ping, and tells him that he is, in fact, his dad for having adopted him. However, Po is unaware that his biological father, Li (Fred Tatasciore), is still alive, living in a panda hideout with the other villagers revealed to be the secret panda village. He finally senses that his son is alive.

Kung Fu Panda 3 (2016)

In Kung Fu Panda 3, Po (Jack Black) is promoted to be a teacher when Shifu (Dustin Hoffman) decides to retire from active duty to focus on honing chi. However, in his first lesson, Po's attempts to train the Furious Five ends disastrously, with the Five injured as a result. Po, demoralized and full of doubt, goes to Shifu for advice, who reveals that he'd deliberately set Po up to fail to help teach him a lesson and advises him that he must be himself. When Po also tries talking about his problems with his father, Mr. Ping, they are interrupted by the arrival of Li Shan (Bryan Cranston), Po's biological father, who breaks Po's dumpling-eating record at the restaurant. After recognizing each other, Po and Li Shan bond, much to Mr. Ping's jealousy. Shortly after bringing his father to the Jade Palace and introducing him to his friends, the Valley of Peace is attacked by living jade statues (referred to as "Jombies" by Po and Monkey) resembling kung fu masters both past and present. After the statues retreat, Po and the others learn that they were sent by Kai (J.K. Simmons), a ferocious warrior who was once Master Oogway's ally. From Oogway's journal's they realize that Kai and Oogway learned the secrets of chi from the pandas from Li Shan's village some 500 years prior. Oogway then banished Kai to the Spirit Realm after Kai tried to take the pandas' powers of chi for himself. As Kai can only be defeated by a master of chi, Po decides to learn the power of chi on Li's suggestions as it was an innate ability of the inhabitants of the panda village. Po is told, however, that he must learn to live like a panda, which he takes to upon arriving in the village and is glad to be a part of.

Later on, Tigress arrives at the Panda Village, revealing that Kai has taken the chi of all the kung fu masters, including Shifu, Crane, Mantis, Viper, and Monkey (she is the only one to escape) and that Kai has destroyed the Jade Palace. Terrified, Li begins evacuating the village while Po demands to be taught how to utilize chi. Li then admits he lied about knowing how to use chi to bring his son home and that all the pandas have forgotten how to use the ability. Hurt by his father's deception, Po isolates himself and trains rigorously to fight Kai, with his self-doubt returning. After talking with Tigress and discovering that Li and the other Pandas have decided to stay and help, Po trains the village to use kung fu. When Kai attacks the village with his jade army, Po's unorthodox forces and tactics initially gain the upper hand. However, when Po tries to use the Wuxi Finger Hold on Kai, he is told by Kai that the technique only works on mortals. Kai then overpowers Po and prepares to take his chi. In a last-ditch effort to save his companions, Po grabs Kai and sends them both to the Spirit Realm, where they battle again and Kai prepares to take Po's chi. After learning from Po about who they are, Li, Tigress, Mr. Ping, and the other pandas use their chi to save Po, causing him to generate a dragon-shaped avatar composed of chi and  defeat Kai by overloading him with the flow of chi from within him.

In the aftermath of the battle, Oogway appears to Po and reveals that Po's journey has come full circle; Oogway reveals that he specifically chose Po as the Dragon Warrior because he is a descendant of the ancient pandas who helped him centuries ago and that Po is the physical embodiment of the Yin and Yang, the right successor to the legacy that Oogway has built. Oogway also reveals that he was responsible for alerting Li Shan to Po's survival and is proud to see how Po has grown and matured. Oogway then presents him with a mystical jade staff that he had earlier when he enter the Spirit Realm to help him return to the mortal world and calls him a master of chi. Upon returning to the Mortal Realm, Po reunites with his family and friends and returns to the Jade Palace, gazing proudly at his legacy and the place where his journey first began. He then instructs the pandas, the kung fu masters and the Valley of Peace residents in giving chi, which spreads good chi across the land.

Short films

Secrets of the Furious Five (2008)

Po (Jack Black) has also improved his physical health when he runs alongside Shifu (Dustin Hoffman) at an amazing pace and upon stopping, needs much less time than before to catch his breath. Shifu then assigns him to teach an introduction to kung fu to a group of rabbit children, to whom Po tries to explain the true meaning of kung fu, illustrating his point with the stories of the Furious Five's pasts.

Kung Fu Panda Holiday Special (2010)

Master Po (Jack Black) is appointed as the host of the Kung Fu masters' Winter Feast at the Jade Palace. Although Po successfully makes the arrangements with considerable difficulty, he decides being with his father for the holiday is more important and joins him at the restaurant. However, all the masters, deeply moved by Po's loyalty, come as well. After this episode, Po moved out to focus on his duties as the Dragon Warrior to reassure that his father is at peace with his calling.

Kung Fu Panda: Secrets of the Masters (2011)

Under the pretense of an emergency in the dead of night, Master Po leads Master Tigress (Angelina Jolie) and Master Mantis (Seth Rogen) into breaking into the new Masters' Council exhibit in tribute to Masters Thundering Rhino (Paul Scheer), Ox (Dennis Haysbert) and Croc (Tony Leondis). Even though Tigress and Mantis are annoyed at the deception, Po engages their interest in the story of the trio of masters first met.

Kung Fu Panda: Secrets of the Scroll (2015)

As Po (Jack Black) grew into his teenage years with a lack of focus and of his father's skill in cooking, which later led to Shifu (Dustin Hoffman) getting food poisoning after Po prepared a meal for the Jade Palace while his father was away on business. Afterward, Po began to consider other possible career paths, such as a cleaner, comedian, dancer or doctor and made a list of them on a scroll. This scroll later inadvertently ended up in Tigress's hands (Kari Wahlgren), who mistook it for a list made by Shifu of four warriors she was to gather to face the villainous Boar. This led to her recruiting Crane (David Cross), Monkey (James Sie), Viper (Lucy Liu) and Mantis (Seth Rogen), who was quickly dismissed by Shifu, who also ordered the evacuation of the valley.

During this time, Po revealed to his father that he had caused Shifu's illness, which his father took as good publicity, and was then sent to gather ingredients for meals to be served to the fleeing villagers. From the hilltop his father had specified, Po then watched as the future Furious Five battled Boar and quickly determined what he wanted to do with his life: practice Kung fu. He later made a set of Furious Five action figures, which he treasured for years.

Television series

Kung Fu Panda: Legends of Awesomeness (2012–16)

In Kung Fu Panda: Legends of Awesomeness, Po (Mick Wingert) and Monkey (James Sie) are best friends in "Scorpion's Sting." Monkey's mind-controlled to kill Po by Scorpion, but the panda reminds him that they're friends and when that doesn't work, Po then hits him. In "Chain Reaction," Po said that he would like to be friends with Tigress (Kari Wahlgren); he tells her that he "dreamed" of being friends with her since he was five and later, when she goes off on him, he says that she "stinks at the friendship and fun ship." In "Bad Po," it is revealed that Po has a split personality: one is kind, considerate, caring, polite, sensitive, very positive, helpful, hard-working, selfless and compassionate (which makes him "Good Po") and the other one is rude, very negative, lazy, sadistic, unhelpful, heartless, abusive, mean-spirited, selfish, manipulative, mischievous, cruel, uncaring, destructive, misbehaved and devious (which makes him "Bad Po" or "Evil Po"). Both of his personalities have been split when he gets infected by the Mystical Mirror of Yin and Yang. Bad Po blames Good Po for his evil deeds and when one panda gets hurt, the other feels the same. In the end, Good Po makes Bad Po look in the mirror and both pandas are rejoined.

Kung Fu Panda: The Paws of Destiny (2018–19)

After fulfilling his true destiny as a Dragon Warrior of the prophecy thanks to his learning of his ancestral bloodline, Po (Mick Wingert) is now a mentor of four panda kids (Nu Hai, Jing, Bao and Fan Tong), who stumbled upon a mythical cave within Panda Village and being chosen by the spirits of Four Constellations, their legendary chi respectively.

Video games
Actor Mick Wingert voices Po in all of the Kung Fu Panda video games except for Legendary Warriors, in which he is voiced by Eric Loomis.

Kung Fu Panda: The Game (2008 June) is a video game loosely based on the first film, released by Activision for Microsoft Windows and Xbox 360; Nintendo DS and Wii; and Sony PlayStation 2 and PlayStation 3.
Kung Fu Panda: Legendary Warriors (2008 November–December) is a sequel to the first Kung Fu Panda game. It was published by Activision on November 5 and December 5, 2008 for the Nintendo DS and Wii, respectively. Po is voiced by Eric Loomis.
Kung Fu Panda World (2010 April 12) is a virtual world online game.
Kung Fu Panda 2 (2011 May 23) is a video game that takes place after the events of the second film. It was developed and published by THQ for Nintendo DS, Wii, PlayStation 3 and Xbox 360.
Kung Fu Panda: Showdown of Legendary Legends (2015 December 1) is a fighting game developed by Vicious Cycle Software and published by Little Orbit for Microsoft Windows, Xbox 360 and Xbox One; Nintendo 3DS and Wii U; and Sony's PlayStation 3 and PlayStation 4.

Reception
Po has received mostly positive critical reception, reaching influence to serve as the other characters, video games and films in the media.

Notes

References

Adoptee characters in films
Animal characters in video games
Animal superheroes
Anthropomorphic bears
Fictional chefs
Fictional Chinese people
Fictional Lóng Xíng Mó Qiáo practitioners
Fictional martial arts trainers
Fictional pacifists
Fictional pandas
Fictional Shaolin kung fu practitioners
Fictional waiting staff
Fictional Zui Quan practitioners
Kung Fu Panda
Male characters in film
Male characters in animated films
Orphan characters in film
Universal Pictures cartoons and characters
Film characters introduced in 2008